The  doubles of the 2011 Ankara Cup - the first edition of the tournament - was won by Nina Bratchikova and Darija Jurak, who defeated Janette Husárová and Katalin Marosi in the final, 6–4, 6–2.

Seeds

Draw

References 
 Main draw

Ankara Cup - Doubles
Ankara Cup